Yongshan County is a county in the northeast of Yunnan Province, China, bordering Sichuan Province to the north and northwest across the Jinsha River. It is under the administration of the prefecture-level city of Zhaotong.

Ethnic groups
There are two main Yi ethnic subgroups in Yongshan County, namely Laluo (腊罗) and Niesu (聂苏).

Administrative divisions
Yongshan County has 8 towns, 5 townships and 2 ethnic townships. 
8 towns

5 townships

2 ethnic townships
 Manan Miao and Yi
 Wuzhai Yi and Miao

Government 
Government address: Xiluodu Town, Yongshan County, Zhaotong, Yunnan 657300

Poverty
Yongshan was a state-designated poor county, which means the average income of its people is below 530 yuan a year - that is, less than 30 US cents a day.

Climate

See also 

 Xiluodu Dam

References

External links
Yongshan County Official Site

 
County-level divisions of Zhaotong